Kobe is a surname. Notable people with the surname include:

 Boris Kobe (1905–1981), Slovenian architect
 Gail Kobe (1932–2013), American actress and television producer
 Masahiko Kobe (born 1969), the "Iron Chef", Italian
 Milan Kobe (1926–1966), Yugoslav association football player
 Primož Kobe (born 1981), Slovenian long-distance runner
 Takumi Kobe (born 1985), Japanese baseball player

See also

 Kobe (given name)
 Kobe (disambiguation), including people known by the mononym